Francis Fowler McEwan ( – 21 September 1944) was a Scottish professional footballer who played in the Scottish League for Airdrieonians as a forward.

Personal life 
At the outbreak of the Second World War, McEwan enlisted in the British Army. As a rifleman in the Rifle Brigade, he was deployed to Europe in July 1944 and died of wounds in the area of Donk on 21 September 1944. He was buried in Mol Communal Cemetery.

Career statistics

References

Scottish footballers
Scottish Football League players
1944 deaths
Scottish military personnel
Rifle Brigade soldiers
Footballers from Airdrie, North Lanarkshire
Association football inside forwards
Whitburn Junior F.C. players
Airdrieonians F.C. (1878) players
Tottenham Hotspur F.C. players
Airdrieonians F.C. (1878) wartime guest players
Hamilton Academical F.C. wartime guest players
British Army personnel killed in World War II
1910s births